Abner C. Brownell (1813–1857) was the mayor of Cleveland, Ohio from 1852–1854.

Brownell was born to Nathan C. and Elizabeth Adams Smith Brownell in Massachusetts where he was locally educated.  Brownell moved to Cleveland in the 1840s and began working in the iron and glass industries employed by the W. A. Otis Co.  He was then a partner in Wick, Otis, & Brownell, a banking firm.  Brownell ran as a Democrat for city council in 1849 and won, serving in that capacity until 1852, when he ran unopposed for mayor.  Brownell was the first mayor of Cleveland to serve two terms in office.  Brownell left office and became a commission merchant until his death in 1857

Brownell was married to Eliza in the early 1830s.  They had four children: Charles H., Cornelia G., John, and Wilford S.

References
 The Encyclopedia of Cleveland History by Cleveland Bicentennial Commission (Cleveland, Ohio), David D. Van Tassel (Editor), and John J. Grabowski (Editor) 

Mayors of Cleveland
1813 births
1857 deaths
Ohio Democrats
19th-century American politicians